Muradnagar is an upazila of the Comilla District in Chittagong Division, Bangladesh.

History
In ancient times, the area was a part of the geopolitical region of Samatata ruled by the Rata dynasty. In the late 20th century, an irrigation canal was being dug in Urishwar, Paharpur Union. During the process, three copper plate inscriptions were discovered, surrounded by old potsherds, supposedly belonging to the Rata dynasty of Samatata.

Muradnagar was previously known as Tholla. During the Mughal period, the area was under the Balda Khal pargana. After the arrival of the East India Company, a number of rebellions and peasant movements took place in Tholla. The 19th-century zamindar Mir Ashraf Ali Shirazi had a house in Tholla. In 1858, Tholla was established as a thana and in 1878, Tholla was renamed to Muradnagar. It was named after the revenue collector Mir Murad Ali.

Khwaja Salimullah, the Nawab of Dhaka donated towards the Muradnagar High School in 1903. In 1941, Captain Narendranath Dutta founded the Sreekail College, an institution of nationwide importance.

Many Muradnagari freedom fighters were murdered during the Bangladesh Liberation War of 1971 during face-offs against the Pakistan Army. The thana was upgraded to an upazila in 1983.

Geography
It has 101,809 households covering a total area of 340.73 km2.

Demographics

According to the 2011 Census of Bangladesh, Muradnagar upazila had a population of 523,556 living in 101,809 households. Its growth rate over the decade 2001-2011 was 11.86%. Muradnagar has a sex ratio of 1115 females per 1000 males and a literacy rate of 48.81%. 32,644 (6.24%) live in urban areas.

Administration
Muradnagar Upazila is divided into 22 union parishads: Akubpur, Andikot (Haidarabad), Babuti Para, Chapitala, Chhaliakandi, Dakshin Ramchandrapur, Darora, Dhamghar, Jahapur, Jatrapur, Kamalla, Muradnagar, Paharpur, Paschim Bangara, Paschim Nabipur, Paschim Porbadhair, Purba Bangara, Purba Nabipur, Purba Purbadhair, Sreekail, Tanki, and Uttar Ramchandrapur. The union parishads are subdivided into 153 mauzas and 301 villages.

List of chairmen

Notable people
Mofazzal Hossain Kaikobad, Politician
Rafiqul Islam Miah, Politician
Yussuf Abdullah Harun, Politician

See also
Muradnagar D. R. Pilot Government High School
Adhyapak Abdul Majid College
Paiyapathar
Haidarabad Hazi E. A. B. High School
Bangora Umalochon High School

References

External links
 http://muradnagar.comilla.gov.bd/
 https://web.archive.org/web/20130503014930/http://www.bbs.gov.bd/webtestapplication/userfiles/image/Census2011/Chittagong/Commilla/Comilla_C04.pdf
 https://web.archive.org/web/20130503014204/http://www.bbs.gov.bd/webtestapplication/userfiles/image/Census2011/Chittagong/Commilla/Comilla%20at%20a%20glance.pdf
 https://web.archive.org/web/20131113172538/http://www.bbs.gov.bd/WebTestApplication/userfiles/Image/BBS/Socio_Economic.pdf

 
Upazilas of Comilla District